Bips Investment Managers is the exchange-traded fund division of Rand Merchant Bank (RMB) a division of FirstRand Bank Limited, one of South Africa’s largest JSE-listed financial services groups.

Bips Investment Managers offers a suite of exchange-traded funds (ETFs) branded as Beta Investment Performance Securities (Bips or BipsETFs). Bips offer investors a range of ETFs that track various indices in both the equities and fixed income markets. Bips are listed and trade on the Johannesburg Stock Exchange (JSE).

See also 
 List of exchange-traded funds
 List of companies traded on the JSE

External links 
 Bips website
 Rand Merchant Bank

Exchange-traded funds